The 1994 United States Senate election in Rhode Island was held November 8, 1994. Incumbent Republican U.S. Senator John Chafee won re-election to a fourth term. Chafee died of heart-failure on October 24, 1999, at Walter Reed Army Medical Center, having already announced his intention to retire in 2000 on March 15, 1999. His son Lincoln, then the mayor of Warwick, was appointed to replace him by Governor Lincoln Almond.

Democratic primary

Candidates 
 Linda Kushner, State Representative

Results 
Kushner faced no opposition in the Democratic primary.

Republican primary

Candidates 
 John Chafee, incumbent U.S. Senator
 Robert A. Post, Jr.

Results

General election

Candidates 
 John Chafee (R), incumbent U.S. Senator
 Linda Kushner (D), State Representative

Polling

Results

See also 
 1994 United States Senate elections

References 

Rhode Island
1994
1994 Rhode Island elections